The 2008 EHF European Men's Handball Championship (8th tournament) was held in Norway from 17 to 27 January, in the cities of Bergen, Drammen, Lillehammer, Stavanger and Trondheim. Denmark won the tournament with Croatia second and France third.

Venues

Qualification

Qualification matches took place in 2007. According to the EHF rules, the host (Norway) and the top six nations from the 2006 European Championship (France, Croatia, Spain, Denmark, Germany, Russia) were automatically qualified. The other nine places were determined after the play-off matches, held in June; nine teams were seeded, after qualifying for the 2006 Championship, while their opponents qualified through the preliminary group stages.

Qualified teams

Note: Bold indicates champion for that year. Italic indicates host for that year.

Draw
The draw was held on 22 June 2007 in the TV2 Studio in Oslo.

Seeding
The seedings were announced on 19 June 2007.

Preliminary round
All times are local (UTC+1).

Group A

Group B

Group C

Group D

Main round

Group I

Group II

Final round

Bracket

Semifinals

Fifth place game

Third place game

Final

Ranking and statistics

Final ranking

All-Star Team
Goalkeeper: 
Left wing: 
Left back: 
Pivot: 
Centre back: 
Right back: 
Right wing: 
Source: EHF

Other awards
Most valuable player: 
Best Defence Player:

Top goalscorers

Source: EHF

Top goalkeepers
(minimum 20% of total shots received by team)

References

 
European
Handball
Handball
2008
January 2008 sports events in Europe
Sports competitions in Trondheim
Sports competitions in Bergen
21st century in Trondheim
21st century in Bergen
Sport in Drammen
Sport in Lillehammer
Sport in Stavanger